Sophronica machadoi is a species of beetle in the family Cerambycidae. It was described by Lepesme in 1953.

References

Sophronica
Beetles described in 1953